Sir Ellis Kadoorie School may refer to:
 Sir Ellis Kadoorie (S) Primary School
 Sir Ellis Kadoorie Secondary School (West Kowloon)